Guido Pieter Theodorus Josephus Gezelle (1 May 1830 – 27 November 1899) was an influential writer and poet and a Roman Catholic priest from Belgium. He is famous for the use of the West Flemish dialect.

Life 

Gezelle was born in Bruges in the province of West Flanders to Monica Devrieze and Pieter Jan Gezelle, a gardener. 
The Flemish writer Stijn Streuvels (Frank Lateur) was a nephew of his. Gezelle was ordained a priest in 1854, and worked as a teacher at the Minor Seminary, Roeselare. He died there in a small room, where it is still forbidden to enter.

There is a museum of his works close by and also a small bar named after him.

He tried to develop an independent Flemish language, more or less separate from the general Dutch language, which had certain more "Hollandic" aspects. The Dutch he used in his poems was heavily influenced by the local West Flemish dialect. His works are often inspired by his mystic love towards God and Creation. Later, his poetry was associated with literary Impressionism, and he is considered a forerunner of that movement.

Gezelle also was a translator of poetry and prose, most famous now for his translation of Henry Wadsworth Longfellow's Song of Hiawatha, published in 1886. He had already read the original at Roeselare in 1856 and was interested in it because on the one hand, the American Indians fascinated him, and, on the other, he liked its portrayal of Christian missionaries.

For his linguistic mastery, Gezelle is considered one of the most important poets of Dutch literature.

Bibliography 

 Kerkhofblommen (1858)
 Vlaemsche Dichtoefeningen (1858)
 Kleengedichtjes (1860)
 Gedichten, Gezangen en Gebeden (1862)
 Longfellows Song of Hiawatha (translation, 1886)
 Tijdkrans (1893)
 Rijmsnoer (1897)
 Laatste Verzen (1901)

See also

 Flemish literature

References

External links
 
 
 Guido Gezelle archives by Bruges Public Library (in English, includes poems in translation)
 
 
  

1830 births
1899 deaths
Writers from Bruges
Flemish poets
Flemish activists
Flemish priests
Belgian Catholic poets
19th-century Belgian Roman Catholic priests
19th-century Belgian poets
19th-century Belgian male writers